Marcel Gendrin (16 March 1904 – 22 June 1957) was a French racing cyclist. He rode in the 1927 Tour de France.

References

1904 births
1957 deaths
French male cyclists
Place of birth missing